The Diocese of Newala is a south-eastern diocese in the Anglican Church of Tanzania: its current bishop is the Rt Rev Oscar Mnung'a.

Notes

Anglican Church of Tanzania dioceses
Anglican bishops of Newala
Morogoro